Emperor Wencheng may refer to:

Feng Ba (died 430), emperor of Northern Yan
Emperor Wencheng of Northern Wei (440–465)